Balandougou is a small town and principal settlement of the commune of Saboula in the Cercle of Kita in the Kayes Region of south-western Mali.

References 

Populated places in Kayes Region